Lemyra nocturna is a moth of the family Erebidae. It was described by Thomas in 1990. It is found on Sumatra.

References

 

nocturna
Moths described in 1990